Brompton Cemetery (originally the West of London and Westminster Cemetery) is since 1852 the first (and only) London cemetery to be Crown property, managed by The Royal Parks, in West Brompton in the Royal Borough of Kensington and Chelsea. It is one of the Magnificent Seven cemeteries. Established by Act of Parliament and laid out in 1839, it opened in 1840, originally as the West of London and Westminster Cemetery. Consecrated by Charles James Blomfield, Bishop of London, in June 1840, it is one of Britain's oldest and most distinguished garden cemeteries. Some 35,000 monuments, from simple headstones to substantial mausolea, mark more than 205,000 resting places. The site includes large plots for family mausolea, and common graves where coffins are piled deep into the earth. It also has a small columbarium, and a secluded Garden of Remembrance at the northern end for cremated remains. The cemetery continues to be open for burials. It is also known as an urban haven for nature. In 2014, it was awarded a National Lottery grant to carry out essential restoration and develop a visitor centre, among other improvements. The restoration work was completed in 2018.

Although the cemetery was originally established by a private company, it is now the property of the Crown.

Location

Brompton Cemetery is adjacent to West Brompton station in west London, England. The main entrance is at North Lodge, Old Brompton Road in West Brompton, SW5, in the Royal Borough of Kensington and Chelsea. There is another entrance at South Lodge, located on the Fulham Road, SW10 near the junction with Redcliffe Gardens.

History

By the early years of the 19th century, inner city burial grounds, mostly churchyards, had long been unable to cope with the number of burials and were seen as a hazard to health and an undignified way to treat the dead. In 1837 a decision was made to lay out a new burial ground in Brompton, London. The moving spirit behind the project was the architect and engineer, Stephen Geary, and it was necessary to form a company in order to get parliamentary permission to raise capital for the purpose. Geary was appointed as architect but was later forced to resign. Securing the land – some 40 acres – from local landowner, Lord Kensington and the Equitable Gas Light Company, as well as raising the money proved an extended challenge. The cemetery became one of seven large, new cemeteries founded by private companies in the mid-19th century (sometimes called the 'Magnificent Seven') forming a ring around the edge of London.

Brompton Cemetery was eventually designed by architect, Benjamin Baud with at its centre, a modest sandstone domed chapel dated 1839, at it southern end, reached by two symmetrical long colonnades, now all Grade II* listed, in the style of St. Peter's Square in Rome, and flanked by catacombs. It was intended to give the feel of a large open air cathedral. It is rectangular in shape with the north end pointing to the northwest and the south end to the southeast. It has a central "nave" which runs from Old Brompton Road towards the central colonnade and chapel. During the 4-year restoration project that began in 2014, an original Victorian flooring with Bath and York stone radial pattern was uncovered underneath the chapel carpet.

Below the colonnades are catacombs which were originally conceived as a cheaper alternative burial to having a plot in the grounds of the cemetery. Unfortunately, the catacombs were not a success and only about 500 of the many thousands of places in them were sold. The Metropolitan Interments Act 1850 gave the government powers to purchase commercial cemeteries. The shareholders of the cemetery company were relieved to be able to sell their shares as the cost of building the cemetery had overrun and they had seen little return on their investment and there were few burials at first.

During World War II the cemetery suffered bomb damage.

Heritage status
As a site, the cemetery is listed Grade I in the English Heritage Register of Parks and Gardens of Special Historic Interest in England. The chapel and each arcade quadrant is separately listed as Grade II*. Frederick Richards Leyland's is the only Grade II* listed funerary monument. Several other individual monuments are listed Grade II. They include:
 Tomb of Peter Borthwick and family
 Burnside Monument (to Iris Burnside drowned on SS Lusitania)
 Chelsea Pensioners Monument
 Tomb of Clement Family
 Tomb of Robert Coombes
 Tomb of Herbert Fitch
 Tomb of Percy E. Lambert
 Mausoleum of Harvey Lewis
 Mausoleum of James McDonald
 Tomb of Alfred Mellon
 Tomb of Barbe Marie Therese Sangiorgi (wife of Soho restaurateur August Kettner)
 Tomb of Samuel Leigh Sotheby

In all there are up to forty items associated with the cemetery which have a Historic England listing, including gates and telephone kiosks.

Burials
Brompton was closed to burials between 1952 and 1996, except for family and Polish interments, of which there are over 300. In the 21st century it is once again a working cemetery, with plots for interments and a 'Garden of Remembrance' for the deposit of cremated remains. Many nationalities and faiths from across the world are represented in the cemetery.

Military graves
From 1854 to 1939, Brompton Cemetery became the London District's Military Cemetery. The Royal Hospital Chelsea purchased a plot in the north west corner where they have a monument in the form of an obelisk; the Brigade of the Guards has its own section south of that. There are 289 Commonwealth service personnel of World War I and 79 of World War II, whose graves are registered and maintained by the Commonwealth War Graves Commission. A number of veterans are listed in the Notable Interments. Although the majority of war graves are in the dedicated railed section to the west – also containing 19th century services graves – a number of servicemen's graves are scattered in other areas. Besides the British there are many notable Czechoslovak, Polish and Russian military burials.

Notable interments
 William Banting – English Undertaker and LCHF protagonist
 Alexander Anderson – Royal Marines general
 Tomasz Arciszewski – Polish socialist politician and Prime Minister of Poland in exile
 Sir Frederick Arthur – army officer
 James Atkinson – surgeon, artist and Persian scholar
 William Edward Ayrton – physicist
 Sir Squire Bancroft – actor and theatre impresario
Thomas Wilson Barnes - British Chess player
 Metropolitan Anthony (Bloom) of Sourozh – Russian Orthodox émigré Metropolitan archbishop, medical doctor and author
 Joseph Bonomi the Younger – sculptor, artist, Egyptologist and museum curator
 George Borrow – author, traveller and linguist
 Peter Borthwick – politician
 Sir Leslie Brass – lawyer and civil servant
 Fanny Brawne – John Keats' muse, buried under her married name, Frances Lindon
 Stanley Brett – actor
 Sir James Browne – engineer
 Francis Trevelyan Buckland – zoologist
 Field Marshal John Fox Burgoyne and his son, Hugh Burgoyne RN – Victoria Cross recipient
 Henry James Byron – actor and dramatist
 General William Martin Cafe – Indian Mutiny hero and VC recipient
 Sir William Wellington Cairns – Australian administrator after whom the city of Cairns is named
 Sir Duncan Cameron – British Army general
 Louis Campbell-Johnston (1861–1929) – founder of the British Humane Association
 Marchesa Luisa Casati – infamous Italian quaintrelle, muse, eccentric and patron of the arts
 John Graham Chambers – founder of the Amateur Athletic Association
 F. B. Chatterton – theatre manager
 Hugh Childers – Liberal statesman
 Charles Coborn – music hall singer and comedian
 Henry Cole – founder of the Victoria and Albert Museum, the Royal Albert Hall, the Royal College of Music, the 1851 Great Exhibition and inventor of the Christmas card
 Robert Collier, 1st Baron Monkswell – Lord Monkswell, Privy Councillor, Attorney General for England and Wales, QC, politician and judge and his wife Isabella Rose
 Robert Coombes – champion professional sculler
 Joseph Thomas Clover – pioneer of anaesthesia
 Hiram Codd – inventor of the Codd bottle
 Thomas Crofton Croker – Irish antiquary, devoted to the collection of Irish poetry and folklore
 William Crookes – chemist and physicist
 Samuel Cunard – founder of the Cunard Line
 Thomas Cundy III – architect
 Thomas Cundy (junior) – master builder
 Thomas Cundy (senior) – architect
 Agnes de Selincourt – missionary and academic
 Sir James Bevan Edwards – army officer
 General Sir William Henry Elliott – army officer
 Corporal Joseph John Farmer – VC recipient
 Nellie Farren – stage actress
 Henry Farrer – artist
 Terence Feely – playwright and author
 Captain Alfred Kirke Ffrench – VC recipient of Indian Mutiny
 Walter Forbes, 18th Lord Forbes
 Robert Fortune – botanist who introduced tea plant from China to India
 Sir John Fowler, 1st Baronet – railway engineer
 Tom Foy – comedian
 Lieutenant-General Sir Charles Craufurd Fraser – VC recipient
 Sir Charles James Freake – untrained architect and builder, creator of much of South Kensington
 Admiral Charles Fremantle – explorer, founded the Swan River Colony (Western Australia) and the city of Fremantle which bears his name
Princes George and Emanuel Galitzine – film producer and Spitfire pilot
 Brian Glover (1934–1997) – television and film actor
 John William Godward – painter
 George Godwin – architect, journalist, and editor of The Builder magazine
 George Goldie – "founded" Nigeria
 Dr Benjamin Golding – founder of Charing Cross Hospital
 Maude Goodman – artist, buried under her married name, Matilda Scanes
 Lucy Gordon – (Actress)
 General Sir Charles Gore
 John Gunter – landowner, secured the south entrance to the cemetery
 Field Marshall Frederick Haines
 Arthur Haliburton, 1st Baron Haliburton, British civil servant
 Corporal Thomas Hancock – VC recipient (unmarked grave)
 James Duffield Harding – landscape painter, lithographer and author
 Sir Augustus Harris – actor
 John Harrison – Royal Navy VC recipient
 Thomas Helmore – choirmaster and author of books on plainsong
 Admiral Algernon Heneage
 Ian Hetherington - video game pioneer
 Tim Hetherington – photojournalist
 Rowley Hill – Bishop of Sodor
 Sir Harold Hood, 2nd Baronet
 Colonel William Hope – VC recipient
 Jean Ingelow – poet and novelist
 John Jackson – boxer
 Geraldine Jewsbury – writer
 Mary Anne Keeley – actress
 Robert Keeley – actor and comedian
 William Claude Kirby – first chairman of Chelsea Football Club
 Dr. Antoni Kutek – wartime medical officer of the MS Batory. His grave is by Mieczysław Lubelski
 Constant Lambert – composer and conductor
 Kit Lambert – music producer and original manager of The Who
 Percy E. Lambert – racing car driver
 Nat Langham – middleweight bare-knuckle boxing champion from 1843 to 1853
 John Leslie-Melville, 9th Earl of Leven
 Sir Edward Letchworth -prominent Freemason
 Frederick Richards Leyland – shipowner and art collector
 Bernard Levin – journalist, author and broadcaster
 Sir John Scott Lillie – Peninsular War veteran, local landowner, inventor and social reformer
 Ralph Robert Wheeler Lingen, 1st Baron Lingen (1819–1905)
 Johann Carl Ludwig Loeffler – manager of Siemens Brothers
 Marie Lohr – actress
 Archibald Low – inventor and author of science books
 David Lyon MP West Indies merchant, landowner and client of Decimus Burton
 Wiktor Łomidze – Georgian-Polish Naval officer
 James McDonald – president of the Anglo-American Oil Company
 Henry McGee (1929–2006) – actor
 John Benjamin Macneill – railway engineer
 George Heming Mason – painter
 General Sir Frederick Francis Maude – VC recipient
 Henry Augustus Mears – founder of Chelsea Football Club
 Alfred Mellon – violinist and composer
 Boyd Merriman, 1st Baron Merriman (1880–1962)
 Lionel Monckton – composer of Edwardian musical comedies
 Lieutenant-Colonel Hugh Montgomery – Royal Marines and intelligence officer, one of the IRA-assassinated Cairo Gang
 Henrietta Moraes – writer, artist's model and muse to Francis Bacon
 Roderick Murchison – geologist, originator of the Silurian system
 Adelaide Neilson – actress
 William Gustavus Nicholson, 1st Baron Nicholson – first Chief of the Imperial General Staff
 Matthew Noble - sculptor
 Count Stanisław Julian Ostroróg – Crimean War veteran, photographer to the Queen
 Eugène Oudin – American baritone
 Sydney Owenson, Lady Morgan – Anglo-Irish writer
 Fanny Bury Palliser – mother of eight children, historian and writer on lace
 Sir William Palliser – inventor and builder of Barons Court
 Emmeline Pankhurst – leading suffragette
 Private Samuel Parkes – VC recipient
 Mrs Howard Paul – actress and singer
 Charles Henry Pearson and his brother Sir John Pearson
 Sir John Lysaght Pennefather – general
 Henry Pettitt – actor, a noteworthy monument with a sculpted head of Pettitt
 John Birnie Philip – sculptor and father in law of the artist James Whistler
 Percy Sinclair Pilcher – inventor and pioneering aviator
 Valentine Cameron Prinsep – Pre-Raphaelite painter
 Sir Robert Rawlinson – military officer
 William Henry Macleod Read – political and social activist and merchant
 Fanny Ronalds – American socialite and singer
 William Michael Rooke – Irish composer
 Blanche Roosevelt – American opera singer and author
 Tim Rose – American singer-songwriter
 Alexander Rotinoff – architect
 William Howard Russell – journalist and war correspondent
 Sir Doyle Money Shaw – naval officer
 William Siborne – Army officer and military historian, maker of the Siborne model
 Samuel Smiles – biographer and inventor of "self-help"
 Albert Richard Smith – writer
 John Snow – anaesthetist and epidemiologist, who demonstrated the link between cholera and infected water
 Farren Soutar – musical comedy actor
 Lord Alan Spencer-Churchill – officer 8th Hussars
 General The Hon. Sir Augustus Almeric Spencer GCB – officer
 Charles Stent – dentist after whom the medical Stent is named
 H.F. Stephens – light railway pioneer
 Robert Story – poet
 Fred Sullivan, Thomas Sullivan and Mary Clementina Sullivan – brother, father and mother of Arthur Sullivan, composer
 Jerzy Swirski – vice-admiral and head of the Polish navy, 1925–1947
 Richard Tauber – operatic tenor
 Sir David Tennant – Speaker of the Cape Parliament.
 William Terriss – actor
 Ernest Thesiger – character actor, The Old Dark House and Bride of Frankenstein
 Frederic Thesiger, 1st Baron Chelmsford – jurist and statesman
 Frederic Augustus Thesiger, 2nd Baron Chelmsford – Commander-in-Chief in the Zulu War
 John Evan Thomas – sculptor
 Brandon Thomas – author of Charley's Aunt
 Stefan Tyszkiewicz – engineer, inventor, car manufacturer, political activist
 Charles Blacker Vignoles – railway engineer, and inventor of the Vignoles rail
 Fred Vokes – actor and dancer
 Jessie Vokes – actress and dancer
 Victoria Vokes – actress
 Colonel Richard Wadeson – VC recipient
 Edward Wadsworth – artist
 Thomas Attwood Walmisley – composer and organist.
 Sir Robert Warburton – Anglo-Indian soldier and administrator
 Jane Wardle – clinical psychologist and pioneer of cancer prevention
 Flight Sub Lieutenant Reginald Alexander John Warneford – VC recipient
 Sir Philip Watts – naval architect, designer of the Elswick cruiser and HMS Dreadnought
 Sir Andrew Scott Waugh – army officer and surveyor, who named the highest mountain in the world after Sir George Everest
 Benjamin Nottingham Webster – actor, theatre manager and playwright
 Sir Thomas Spencer Wells – surgeon to Queen Victoria, medical professor and president of the Royal College of Surgeons of England
 Private Francis Wheatley – Crimean War veteran, VC recipient
 Jack Whitley – professional footballer
 Sir William Fenwick Williams – general, pasha and governor
 John Wisden – cricketer and founder of Wisden Cricketers' Almanack
 John Lewis Wolfe – architect, artist and stockbroker
 Bennet Woodcroft – textile manufacturer, industrial archaeologist, pioneer of marine propulsion, patent reformer and first clerk to the Patent Commissioners
 Thomas Wright – antiquarian and writer
 General William Wylde (1788-1877) Colonel in Chief of the Royal Artillery
 Johannes Zukertort aka Jan Hermann Zukertort – Polish-Jewish chess master
 J.P. Knight - Inventor Of The First Traffic Light
It was originally planned that Sir Arthur Sullivan of Gilbert and Sullivan fame would also be buried there with his family, until Queen Victoria insisted on his interment in St Paul's Cathedral.

Exhumations
In the late 1880s when the nearby Earl's Court Exhibition Grounds played host to the American Show with Buffalo Bill, a number of Native American performers in the show, died while on tour in Britain. The Sioux chief, Long Wolf, a veteran of the Oglala Sioux wars was buried here on 13 June 1892 having died age 59 of bronchial pneumonia. He shared the grave with a 17-month-old Sioux girl named White Star believed to have fallen from her mother's arms while on horseback. A British woman, Elizabeth Knight, traced his family 105 years later and campaigned with them to have his remains returned to the land of his birth. In 1997, Chief Long Wolf was finally moved to a new plot at Wolf Creek Cemetery (ancestral burial ground of the Oglala Sioux tribe) in Pine Ridge, South Dakota.

His great-grandson John Black Feather said "Back then, they had burials at sea, they did ask his wife if she wanted to take him home and she figured that as soon as they hit the water they would throw him overboard, so that's why they left him here."

There was a Brulé Sioux tribesman buried in Brompton named Paul Eagle Star. His plot was in the same section as Oglala Sioux warrior Surrounded By the Enemy who died in 1887 from a lung infection at age 22. Like Long Wolf, he took part of Buffalo Bill's Wild West Show. Paul died a few days after breaking his ankle when he fell off a horse in August 1891. His casket was exhumed in spring of 1999 by his grandchildren, Moses and Lucy Eagle Star. The reburial took place in Rosebud's Lakota cemetery. Philip James accompanied the repatriation.

Little Chief and Good Robe's 18-month-old son, Red Penny, who travelled in Buffalo Bill's Wild West Show is also buried here. His specific resting place within the cemetery is not known.

Two notable Polish figures originally buried in Brompton Cemetery were reburied in Powazki Cemetery, Warsaw:
 General Michał Karaszewicz-Tokarzewski – founder of a Polish resistance unit in the Second World War and war hero, who died in Casablanca on 22 May 1964. The urn containing his ashes was reburied at Powazki in September 1992.
 Major General Felicjan Sławoj Składkowski – prime minister of Poland before outbreak of the Second World War, who died in London in August 1962, was reburied at Powazki on 8 June 1990.
Two other exhumations involved Polish bishops of the Polish Orthodox Church:
 Sawa, Jerzy Jewgieniewicz Sowietow, rus. Георгий Евгеньевич Советов – Gieorgij Jewgienjewicz Sowietow, (1898 in St Petersburg – 1951 in London) – bishop of the Polish Autocephalous Orthodox Church and bishop in the Polish Armed Forces during World War II.
 Bishop Mateusz, Konstanty Siemaszko (1894 in Babice – 1985 in London) – bishop of the Polish Orthodox Church.
Both were re-buried at the Orthodox Cemetery, Warsaw on 31 December 2012.

Funerary art
The richness of the art and symbolism contained in many graves traces art movements across two centuries. Aside from the stonemason's and sculptor's craft, there is a vast array of lettering, decorative ironwork (sadly in a very corroded state) and ceramics. Some graves and mausolea are the work of noted artists and architects.

Flora and fauna

Although never envisaged as a park, JC Loudon devised the original planting scheme that was not fully realised, however, pines were imported from Poland with the prospect that in maturity they would cast shade over the graves. There are over 60 species of trees, of which the limes are dated to 1838. The fact of the enclosure of the cemetery by a wall, has preserved almost intact, a distinct area of Victorian country flora. The adjacent West London line afforded a green corridor for many years, enriched by ballast from the South Downs when Counter's Creek was filled in and two railway lines constructed in mid-19th century, although a small wetland area was preserved by West Brompton station. However recent redevelopment along the station has further reduced local biodiversity and further reductions are planned with the major redevelopment of nearby Earls Court Exhibition Centre.

In the cemetery each season brings its features, like snow-drops and bluebells or wild lupin and foxgloves, broad-leaf pea, ferns and horse tail. There are small scale wooded areas and meadows. Since the land was used for market gardens, there are wild cabbages, asparagus and garlic among the slabs. A grape vine has fallen victim to maintenance. In Autumn, there can be a display of fungi, a mycologist's trove. The evergreens and ivy are a haven for birds and countless insects. Over 200 species of moth and butterfly have been identified in the cemetery. Despite the absence of a permanent water feature, there have been sightings of amphibians, notably a toad. Mammals are represented by bats, a range of rodents, including grey squirrels and one or two families of foxes. Among the birds, there is a long-standing population of carrion crows and several garden species with the addition of green woodpeckers and occasionally, nesting kestrels and ring-necked parakeets. The appearance of a female ring-necked pheasant in 2012 was short-lived.

"Brompton Cemetery has been identified as a Site of Borough Importance for Nature Conservation (grade I) comprising moderately diverse grassland that contains at least three notable London species that support a diverse assemblage of invertebrates".

Public access
The cemetery is open daily to the public throughout the year, with opening times varying with the seasons. It is regularly visited by the Parks Police Service to monitor and curb occurrences of anti-social behaviour.
Dog walking and cycling, under strict control, is permitted on indicated paths. Through traffic is forbidden and there is no parking. Any visiting vehicles must observe a 5 mph limit. The byelaws are displayed on boards at both entrances.
The Friends of Brompton Cemetery organise Open Days, regular tours and other public attractions.

The cemetery has a reputation for being a popular cruising ground for gay men.

Beatrix Potter connection

Beatrix Potter, who lived in Old Brompton Road nearby and enjoyed walking around it, may have taken the names of some of her characters from tombstones in the cemetery. Names of people buried there included Mr Nutkins, Mr McGregor, Mr Brock, Mr Tod, Jeremiah Fisher and even a Peter Rabbett, although it is not known for certain if there were tombstones with all these names.

In film

Brompton Cemetery has featured in a number of films, including Sherlock Holmes (2009), as the exterior of a Russian church in Goldeneye, Stormbreaker, Johnny English, The Wings of the Dove,  Eastern Promises, and The Gentlemen.

Gallery

See also
 Magnificent Seven cemeteries
 Funerary art
 London Cemetery and Extension
 Victorian cemetery
 Commonwealth War Graves Commission

References

Further reading
 Culbertson, Judi; Randall, Tom (1991). Permanent Londoners: An Illustrated Guide to the Cemeteries of London. Post Mills, Vermont: Chelsea Green Publishing Company.
  Digitized by the University of Michigan, 12 Oct 2007.
 Meller, Hugh; Parsons, Brian (2008). London Cemeteries: an illustrated guide and gazetteer, The History Press. 
 Beach, Darren (2008). London's Cemeteries. Metro Guides.

External links

 Official Website
 Friends of Brompton Cemetery
 Commonwealth War Graves Commission website
 YouTube – Brompton Cemetery – Guided Tour
 Aerial view from 1947, from the English Heritage "Britain from Above" archive

1839 establishments in England
Brompton Cemetery 
Crown Estate
Anglican cemeteries in the United Kingdom

Burial sites of the Spencer-Churchill family
Cemeteries in London
Commonwealth War Graves Commission cemeteries in England
Grade I listed parks and gardens in London
Grade II* listed buildings in the Royal Borough of Kensington and Chelsea
Parks and open spaces in the Royal Borough of Kensington and Chelsea
West Brompton
Rural cemeteries